Meselu Abera Tesfamariam is an Ethiopian professional  footballer who plays as a forward for and the Ethiopia women's national team. In 2018, she scored three goals in the 2018 CECAFA Women's Championship to win the top goal scorer of the competition award.

References 

Living people
Ethiopian women's footballers
Ethiopia women's international footballers
Women's association football forwards
Year of birth missing (living people)